The Informed Medical Options Party (formerly known as the Involuntary Medication Objectors (Vaccination/Fluoride) Party) is an Australian political party. The party's policies oppose compulsory vaccination programs and water fluoridation. The Party states that these are "mass-medication programs" where there is "genuine scientific uncertainty about the benefits and risks in a genetically diverse population". Australian Medical Association president Tony Bartone said the party's views "lack the backing of scientific evidence" and that its members "should consider the harm that can ensue upon the Australian community". It was registered for federal elections on 26 October 2016.

Party secretary Michael O'Neill said the "anti-vaxxer" label regularly used by critics was "insulting".

The party ran candidates in NSW, Qld and WA in the May 2019 Australian federal election for the Australian Senate and received a total of 17,055 total votes as first preference. They were not successful in having a candidate elected.

In February 2020, the Federal Health Minister Greg Hunt opposed the party's application to change its name to the Informed Medical Options Party saying "that such a name would be misleading". The party was successful in its application.

In March 2020, Tom Barnett, a party candidate in the 2019 federal election, created a video discussing coronavirus. In it, he stated: "You can’t catch a virus; it's impossible" and "the only way that you can catch a virus is by having it injected into your bloodstream". The video was removed from Facebook and YouTube, with the companies stating that the video was in breach of their policies.

See also
 Fluoride Free WA
 Health Australia Party
 Judy Wilyman
 Barbara O'Neill
 Taylor Winterstein

References 

Political parties in Australia
Anti-vaccination organizations
Conspiracy theorists
2016 establishments in Australia
Political parties established in 2016